Captain's Wood is a 62 hectare nature reserve in Sudbourne in Suffolk. It is owned and managed by the Suffolk Wildlife Trust.

This site has woodland, rough grassland and scrub. A herd of fallow deer helps to keep the land open, and there are also barn owls, buzzards, mature oak trees and many bluebells.

There is access from School Road.

References

Suffolk Wildlife Trust